Berlinek  is a village in the administrative district of Gmina Jeziora Wielkie, within Mogilno County, Kuyavian-Pomeranian Voivodeship, in north-central Poland.

Between 1975 and 1998 it was administered as part of the Bydgoszcz Voivodeship.

References

Berlinek